Fotilas is a Greek surname. Notable people with the surname include:

Asimakis Fotilas (1761–1835), Greek politician and revolutionary leader
Panagiotakis Fotilas (died 1824), Greek politician and revolutionary leader

Greek-language surnames
Surnames